Prothinodes is a genus of moths belonging to the family Tineidae.

Species
Prothinodes arvicola Meyrick, 1924
Prothinodes grammocosma (Meyrick, 1888)
Prothinodes lutata Meyrick, 1914

References

Tineidae
Moths of New Zealand
Tineidae genera
Taxa named by Edward Meyrick